Sabaneta is a town in Venezuela's Barinas state. It is known to be the birthplace of the late President of Venezuela, Hugo Chávez and his siblings. Sabaneta is the capital of Alberto Arvelo Torrealba Municipality in Barinas. The town was founded by Juan de Alhama in 1787. The principal industry is sugar production.

Populated places in Barinas (state)
Populated places established in 1787
1787 establishments in Venezuela